James "Pee Wee" Madison (May 4, 1935 – January 7, 2008) was an American blues guitar player.

Early life
Born in Osceola, Arkansas, he moved to Chicago in the late 1950s, molding his musicianship on that of Little Walter.  His big chance came when he joined the band of Muddy Waters in 1963, replacing guitarist Pat Hare who was incarcerated for killing his girlfriend.

Career
Starting in 1964, Madison played on most of Muddy Waters' recordings. He played with Muddy Waters' band until the ending of Muddy Waters' world tour in 1973, mostly playing rhythm guitar on an upside-down Fender Mustang.

While traveling through Illinois with Muddy Waters on Oct. 26, 1969, Madison was injured in an accident. He spent two days in the hospital recovering from his injuries. The young couple that collided with Muddy waters and his band on U.S. Route 45 were both killed in the accident.

Discography

With Muddy Waters
Muddy, Brass & the Blues (Chess, 1966)
Live at Mr. Kelly's (Chess, 1971)
Can't Get No Grindin' (Chess, 1973)
With Otis Spann
The Blues Never Die! (Prestige, 1965)

References

1935 births
2008 deaths
American blues guitarists
American male guitarists
People from Osceola, Arkansas
Guitarists from Arkansas
Guitarists from Chicago
20th-century American guitarists
20th-century American male musicians